Maryam Eisler (née Homayoun) is an Iranian-born, London-based artist and former marketer. She is known as a photographer, writer, book editor, art collector, and she serves on many boards.

Early life and education
Born in Tehran, Iran in 1968, Eisler emigrated to Paris, France at age 10.

Eisler holds a BA degree in Political Science from Wellesley College (1989) and an MBA degree from Columbia University (1993).

She has worked in consumer marketing at L'Oreal (1993–1998) followed by Estee Lauder (1998– 2001) in both London and New York City.

Career
Eisler's first series, in 2016, was Searching for Eve in the American West. Her second major series, in 2017, was Eurydice in Provence.

Eisler is a regular writer and contributor to Harpers Bazaar and has also contributed articles to Vanity Fair UK, Art and Auction magazine, and Canvas Magazine.

She has edited six books on art published by Thames & Hudson.

In 2014, Eisler was voted by Artnet as one of the "100 Most Powerful Women in Art" for her art collection, and one of "The Most Influential Women in the European art world".

In 2019, her exhibition Imagining Tina: A Dialogue With Edward Weston was held at the Tristan Hoare gallery, London.

Boards
Eisler is a trustee of the Whitechapel Gallery, London, co-chair of Tate's MENAAC (Middle East North African Acquisitions Committee), and is a member of Tate's International Council. Eisler is also a founding member of the British Museum's CaMMEA committee (Contemporary and Modern Middle East Acquisitions), and sits on the Strategic Advisory Panel for the Delfina Foundation and Columbia University Global Centers. Eisler sits on the advisory board for Photo London art fair, and is a nominator for the Prix Pictet Photography Prize, as well as an Ambassador for Unseen Fair in Amsterdam. She also served on Wellesley College's board between 2012 and 2015.

 Publications 
 Publication by Eisler Voices: East London. London: Thames & Hudson; TransGlobe, 2017. . With contributions by Gilbert & George and Jonny Woo.

 Publications edited by Eisler Unleashed: Contemporary Art from Turkey (2010). London: Thames & Hudson; TransGlobe. Art & Patronage: The Middle East (2010). London: Thames & Hudson. Sanctuary: Britain's Artists and their Studios (2012). London: Thames & Hudson; TransGlobe. Waters, Florence Sanctuary: Britain’s Artists and their Studios: review The Telegraph Retrieved on 21 June 2016Art Studio America: Contemporary Artist’s Spaces (2013). London: Thames & Hudson; TransGlobe. Laurence, Rebecca American Artists in their Studios BBC Retrieved on 21 June 2016London Burning: Portraits from a Creative City'' (2015). London: Thames & Hudson; TransGlobe.

References

External links
Collector Maryam Eisler Debuts Her Photography in London, Artnet, 2016
Getty Images
The Guardian feature of Eisler's book Voices: East London (2017)

1968 births
Living people
20th-century Iranian women artists
21st-century Iranian women artists
20th-century women photographers
21st-century women photographers
Iranian photographers
People from Tehran
Artists from Paris
Photographers from London
Iranian emigrants to France
Iranian emigrants to the United Kingdom